Pudens is a Roman cognomen meaning "modest", borne by a number of individuals, including:

 Aulus Pudens, a centurion and friend of the poet Martial
 Saint Pudens, an early Roman Christian mentioned in 2 Timothy in the New Testament
 Lucius Arrius Pudens, consul in 165
 Quintus Servilius Pudens, consul in 166
 Gaius Valerius Pudens, a Roman general of the 3rd century